is an airport serving northern and central Fukushima Prefecture, Japan, located in the city of Sukagawa.

History
Fukushima Airport was conceived in the late 1970s, and planning at the prefectural level began in 1981. Construction took place between 1988 and 1991, and the airport opened on March 20, 1993. The international terminal was opened in 1999.

The last episode of the TV drama Crying Out Love, In the Center of the World was filmed at Fukushima Airport in 2004.

The airport remained operational during and following the 2011 Tōhoku earthquake and Fukushima Daiichi nuclear disaster in March, 2011, and temporarily saw increased domestic service during the closure of the Tōhoku Shinkansen high-speed rail line to Tokyo. The disasters caused minor damage to the airport itself but led to the suspension of scheduled international service by Asiana Airlines (to Seoul) and China Eastern Airlines (to Shanghai). In November, 2011, the airport terminal operator filed a claim against Tokyo Electric Power for 48 million yen in lost profits stemming from the lost international service.  Asiana is considering resumption of scheduled service to Seoul due to the resurgent popularity of charter services with both Japanese and Korean tourists, but the Shanghai service appears much less likely to resume in the foreseeable future.

Airlines and destinations

Statistics

Land traffic 
 Limousine bus

Route and highway buses

Reservation system buses

Train

References

External links

  Official home page
 
 

Airports in Japan
Transport in Fukushima Prefecture
Buildings and structures in Fukushima Prefecture
Airports established in 1993
1993 establishments in Japan
Sukagawa, Fukushima